Un camino hacia el destino (English: Road To Destiny) is a Mexican telenovela produced by Nathalie Lartilleux for Televisa. It is based on the Mexican telenovela La hija del jardinero, which was produced in 2003 by TV Azteca.

The series stars Paulina Goto as "Luisa Fernanda" and Horacio Pancheri as "Carlos".

Synopsis
Luisa Fernanda Pérez, a beautiful, 18-year-old student, has two passions: mastering the violin and gardening, a skill she learned from her father, Pedro, the former groundskeeper of the wealthy Altamirano family's estate. A chance encounter with destiny alters her life after she is injured in a car accident caused by Luis (her biological father), a playboy lawyer and falls for his stepson, Carlos, an attractive, young doctor treating her at the local hospital.

Cast

Main 
 Paulina Goto as Luisa Fernanda
 Horacio Pancheri as Carlos Gómez
 Jorge Aravena as Pedro Pérez
 Ana Patricia Rojo as Mariana Altamirano
 Lisette Morelos as Amelia Altamirano
 Manuel Landeta as Hernán Sotomayor
 René Strickler as Luis Montero
 Eugenia Cauduro  as Marissa Gómez
 Patricia Reyes Spíndola as Blanca
 Gustavo Rojo as Don Fernando Altamirano
 Brandon Peniche as Javier

Secondary 

 Rocío Banquells as Guadalupe 
 Agustín Arana as Licenciado Ignacio Ordóñez
 Candela Márquez as Isabela de León
 Ianis Guerrero as César
 Yuliana Peniche as Andrea Fonseca
 Alejandro Peniche as Felipe
 Andrés Pardavé as José
 Vanya Aguayo as Carolina de León
 Aranza Carreiro as Camila Sotomayor
 Lalo Brito as Hernán
 Samadhi Zendejas as Nadia
 Arena Ibarra as Adelina
 Claudia Martín as Vicky
 Bárbara López as Lucero
 Constanza Mirko as Virginia
 Aurora Clavel as Rosario
 María Morena as Migdalia
 Sheyla Tadeo as Sor Sonrisa
 Rocío Banquells as Guadalupe
 Harry Geithner as Leopoldo

Guest starts 
 Rebeca Manríquez as Hermana Rosaura Pérez
 Alejandro Ruiz as Solórzano

Background and casting process 
Producer Nathalie Lartilleux's plans for a new telenovela were revealed in the spring of 2015. Goto confirmed in an interview that Un camino hacia el destino is not a remake of La hija del jardinero. Instead, it is based on some elements from the original telenovela. Casting for the telenovela began in late October 2015 where Paulina Goto auditioned for the lead role of  "Luisa Fernanda". Goto took violin lessons for her role before production began on the program. Her casting in the telenovela was announced days later on November 6, 2015. Argentine actor, Horacio Pancheri, was later cast in the lead male role. Eugenia Cauduro and René Strickler were both confirmed for the telenovela in mid-November.
The opening theme song of the telenovela is performed by Paulina Goto.

Filming
Production on the telenovela began on November 23, 2015 on location in Villa Victoria, a town located outside Mexico City. Additional scenes are filmed in Mexico City and at Televisa San Ángel. The cast also filmed several scenes in Cabo San Lucas, Mexico in mid-February 2016.

Promotion
On January 19, 2016, a private press event for the telenovela was held at Televisa San Ángel. A trailer featuring new scenes was also presented, and the principal cast and crew members were officially introduced to the media. Goto played the violin with an orchestra and sang the telenovela's theme song, "Mi camino eres tú". The event was streamed live on the telenovela's official website.

Broadcast 
The series premiered on January 25, 2016, in Mexico on El Canal de las Estrellas and currently airs weeknights. On February 23, 2016, it began airing weeknights in United States on Univision. Its premiere episode on Univision was watched by 2,086,000 viewers. The last episode was broadcast in August 29, 2016

Awards and nominations

References

External links

2016 telenovelas
Mexican telenovelas
Televisa telenovelas
2016 Mexican television series debuts
2016 Mexican television series endings
Television series reboots
Spanish-language telenovelas